Sigurd Akre-Aas (12 June 1897 – 18 June 1968) was a Norwegian fencer. He competed at the 1924 and 1928 Summer Olympics.

He also won the national championships in the 1920s – most of them with the sabre (1922, 1923, 1925, 1926 and 1928). In his private life, he was an engineer specialising in refrigerator systems. He survived the war years as an inventor of small household appliances. The company he started in 1946 still exists. A bronze statue was unveiled of him at the 2019 Veidemann Festival in Åkrestrømmen culture park in Rendalen municipality.

References

External links
 

1897 births
1968 deaths
People from Rendalen
Norwegian male sabre fencers
Olympic fencers of Norway
Fencers at the 1924 Summer Olympics
Fencers at the 1928 Summer Olympics
Sportspeople from Innlandet
20th-century Norwegian people